MasterChef Myanmar is a Burmese competitive cooking show. It is based on the UK Cooking show MasterChef produced by Endemol Shine Group. It is airing on MRTV-4.

Hosts and Judges

Hosts
Key:
 Current host 
 Previous host

Judging panel

Key:
 Current judging panel
 Previous judge(s)

Contestants

Season 1

Top 20
Tin Tin Oo (Winner)
Aung Wai Phyo (Runner-up)
Nilar Aung Win
Phyo Thurain Oo
May Phyo Thi
Khant Zaw Oo
Aye Aye Thein
Thiha Min Thway
Sa Wai Yan Oo
Htet Myat Oo
Kyawt Kaythi Aung
Khin Cho Mar
Nwet Nwet Win
Htain Lin Mg
Zar Zar Aye
Nang Aye Aye Than
Win Zaw Lwin
Phyo Arkar Hein
Thandar Aye
Saw Zin Moe

Season 2

Top 20
Arkar (Winner)
Nay Aung (Runner-up)
Shoon Shoon Aung
Naing Zaw
Naw Lah June Phaw
Aye Thazin
May Hnin Phway
Kaung Kin Htet
Tharr Htet Shann
Sushma Arya
Pyae Pyae
Phoe Wa Aung
Htun Kyaw Oo
Zin Min Min Htet
Mg Mg Ye Yint
Kyaw Soe Han
Gwan Ja La
Bo Bo Ko
Seng Jet Aung
Shio Thaw Zin

Season 3

Top 20
Hsu Mon Hnin (Winner)
Myint Thu Htet (Runner-up)
Moe Thu
Ye Lwin Oo
Nan Htike Oo
Min Khant Maw
Ko Sai
Hein Htet Aung
Nine Nine Win
Than Than Swe
In Yan Ywal Sant
Sai Aung Kyaw Kyaw
Myo Myint Oo
Ye Pyae Paing
Lwin Lwin Kyu
Khin San Tint
Kyaw Ko Ko Zin
Hein Min Latt
Khaing Zar Chi Than
Nyan Min Phyo

Season 4

Top 13
Hein Htet Aung (Winner)
Min Khant Maw (Runner-up)
Nay Aung
Nan Htike Oo
Ko Sai
Kaung Kin Htet
Aye Thazin
Htet Myat Oo
Shoon Shoon Aung
Lwin Lwin Kyu
Ning Rang Roi San
Phoe Wa Aung
Htain Lin Maung

Series overview

References

External links
 

Burmese television series
Game shows
MasterChef
MRTV (TV network) original programming
MasterChef Myanmar